Jan Plodek (born November 26, 1978) is a Czech former professional ice hockey player. He played in the Czech Extraliga for HC Bílí Tygři Liberec.

External links

Jan Plodek on the official HC Liberec website

1978 births
BK Mladá Boleslav players
Czech ice hockey forwards
HC Benátky nad Jizerou players
HC Bílí Tygři Liberec players
Living people
Sportspeople from Liberec
Twin sportspeople
Czech twins